Medon is a genus of rove beetles in the family Staphylinidae. There are at least 60 described species in Medon.

Species
These 67 species belong to the genus Medon:

 Medon adamsoni Cameron, 1933 g
 Medon americanus Casey, 1905 g
 Medon apicalis (Kraatz, 1857) g
 Medon augur Fauvel, 1906 g
 Medon beroni Coiffait, 1970 g
 Medon brunneus (Erichson, 1839) g
 Medon bulgaricus Coiffait, 1970 g
 Medon castaneus (Gravenhorst, 1802) g
 Medon cauchoisi Jarrige, 1949 g
 Medon celebensis Sharp, 1908 i c g
 Medon cerrutii Coiffait, 1976 g
 Medon choparti Coiffait, 1987 g
 Medon confertus Sharp g
 Medon convergens (Casey, 1886) g
 Medon croaticus Toth, 1980 g
 Medon ctenophorum Hatch, 1957 g
 Medon despectus (Fairmaire, 1860) g
 Medon dilutus (Erichson, 1839) g
 Medon dobrogicus Decu & Georgescu, 1995 g
 Medon erevanensis Coiffait, 1970 g
 Medon feloi Assing, 1998 g
 Medon ferrugineus (Erichson, 1840) g
 Medon fuscipennis Kraatz, 1859 i c g
 Medon fusculus (Mannerheim, 1830) g
 Medon gomyi Lecoq, 1987 g
 Medon guignoti Coiffait, 1987 g
 Medon guppyi (Hatch, 1957) g
 Medon haafi Scheerpeltz, 1956 g
 Medon hatchi Herman, 2003 g
 Medon indigena (Wollaston, 1857) g
 Medon insulanus b
 Medon insularis Casey, 1905 g
 Medon laticollis (Casey, 1889) g
 Medon lecoqi Janák, 2014 g
 Medon lewisius Sharp g
 Medon macedonicus Coiffait, 1976 g
 Medon marinus Cameron, 1944 g
 Medon mcleodi Hatch, 1957 g
 Medon olympicus Scheerpeltz, 1963 g
 Medon pacifica Cameron, 1933 g
 Medon papeetensis Coiffait, 1980 g
 Medon paradobrogicus Decu & Georgescu, 1995 g
 Medon perniger Coiffait, 1978 g
 Medon petrochilosi Coiffait, 1970 g
 Medon piceus (Kraatz, 1858) g
 Medon planus (Kraatz, 1859) g
 Medon pocofer (Peyron, 1858) g
 Medon pocoferus (Peyron, 1857) g
 Medon prolixus (Sharp, 1874) g
 Medon pugetensis Hatch, 1957 g
 Medon pythonissa (Saulcy, 1864) g
 Medon quadratus Hatch, 1957 g
 Medon rhodiensis Scheerpeltz, 1963 g
 Medon ripicola (Kraatz, 1854) g
 Medon rubeculus Sharp, 1889 g
 Medon rufipenne b
 Medon rufiventris (Nordmann, 1837) g
 Medon sardous Dodero, 1922 g
 Medon shastanicus (Casey, 1905) g
 Medon subcoriaceus (Wollaston, 1864) g
 Medon submaculatus Sharp g
 Medon subterraneus Coiffait, 1970 g
 Medon tahitiensis Coiffait, 1976 g
 Medon truncatus Hatch, 1957 g
 Medon vancouveri (Casey, 1905) g
 Medon vicentensis Serrano, 1993 g
 Medon vitalei Bernhauer, 1936 g

Data sources: i = ITIS, c = Catalogue of Life, g = GBIF, b = Bugguide.net

References

Further reading

External links

 

Paederinae